Eli Fletcher (15 December 1887 – 6 August 1954) was an English footballer who played as a left-back for Crewe Alexandra, Manchester City, Watford, Sandbach Ramblers, and Ards.

Career
Fletcher played for Crewe Alexandra and Manchester City. During World War I he appeared for Port Vale as a guest in a 5–2 win over Manchester United in a Lancashire Regional section, Subsidiary Tournament match on 28 April 1917; he also played for the club as a guest in April 1919. He later played for Watford, Sandbach Ramblers, and Ards. He later became a coach at Manchester City.

Career statistics
Source:

References

1887 births
1954 deaths
People from Tunstall, Staffordshire
English footballers
Association football fullbacks
Crewe Alexandra F.C. players
Manchester City F.C. players
Watford F.C. players
Sandbach Ramblers F.C. players
Ards F.C. players
English Football League players
Port Vale F.C. wartime guest players
Association football coaches
Manchester City F.C. non-playing staff